Timothy Leslie "Tommy" Boyd (born 14 December 1952) is a British radio presenter.

Television
From 1977 to 1980, Boyd was co-presenter of the ITV children's magazine programme Magpie replacing Douglas Rae. In 1981, he presented What's Happening?, a news quiz. He also presented the Saturday TV-am show Wide Awake Club from 1986–1990, and its Sunday spin-off WAC Extra, throughout the 1980s.  In 1982, he joined the cast of Jigsaw, including Janet Ellis, Sylvester McCoy and David Rappaport. Boyd also hosted Children's BBC programme called Puzzle Trail.

Between 1982 and 1984, Boyd fronted Central Television's Saturday morning kids TV show The Saturday Show alongside Isla St Clair, and followed this with Saturday Starship in 1985 (co-presented by Bonnie Langford). He was the host of CITV between 1991 and 1993. In 1993 and 1994, Boyd worked on The Children's Channel, a satellite television channel. In 1997, Boyd presented the TV programme MLB on Five.

Radio

During the late 1970s, he hosted the Saturday morning radio show Jellybone, aimed at children, on LBC radio in London. The show featured items such as a phone-in news quiz, and a segment where group or club members – such as bus spotters – were invited into the studio to discuss their hobby, and to take part in the Jellybone Jury, reviewing and scoring the latest record releases. He later hosted the weekend Nightline phone-in programme, replacing Jeremy Beadle as host on Sunday nights in June 1980. The programme is remembered for its mystery guest segment, where a famous person would come in and put on a fake voice and listeners would call in and guess who it was – Roy Castle once featured and "talked" only by playing his trombone.  For his Nightline show Boyd was awarded the Royal Variety Club Radio Personality of the Year. He returned to children's radio on LBC with a Sunday afternoon programme called Lazily Stacey, named after a fictional detective he had invented.  He later co-presented the breakfast show with Anne Diamond, before finally leaving the station in 1999.

During the late 1980s, Boyd was a radio presenter on the ILR station Southern Sound on the late Sunday evening show along with Nicky Keig-Shevlin and David Legg. The format of the show was phone-in/quiz style with the occasional record thrown in – "Two Little Boys" by Rolf Harris and "Narcissus" by Bonzo Dog Doo-Dah Band being two that featured regularly. Boyd signed off each show by playing "What a Wonderful World" by Louis Armstrong.

On BBC Radio 5 Live he presented the weekday afternoon show between 14:00 and 17:00, which consisted of sport and music.

He was a radio presenter on the British AM station Talk Radio (later talkSPORT) from its inception in February 1995 until November 1998, when he lost his job in a reshuffle at the station after it was taken over by a consortium led by former Sun newspaper editor Kelvin MacKenzie. It was during this tenure that Boyd consolidated his reputation for being controversial. Broadcasting at first from 15:00 to 19:00, the format of the show would involve Boyd making a proposition (e.g. "Save a life ... Humiliate a sunbather" or "Who needs their legs?") and engaging in a frequently heated debate. Less argumentative strands of the show would also see the emergence of "The Angry Hour" and "The Wonderful Hour", the latter of which would always take place during the final hour of the Friday show.

In January 2000, Talk Radio was relaunched as talkSPORT, but with part of its schedules being retained for talk and non-sport phone in. After covering for absent presenters on several occasions, Boyd took up a permanent position in April 2000. In May, he began an experiment on his Sunday night slot whereby calls would go straight to air unscreened. This later evolved into The Human Zoo. Boyd presented the show with Asher Gould. This style of programme came to light again in May 2006 when LBC presenter Iain Lee started a show called Triple M, expanded from a half-hour section of his regular show using this format. Boyd also hosted a professional wrestling radio show on talkSPORT called Talk Wrestling. The show's success prompted him to investigate re-introducing wrestling as a mainstream entertainment in the UK. He hired Crystal Palace and put on one of the biggest UK-run wrestling shows in recent years, including the future WWE heavyweight champion, Eddie Guerrero. Boyd was sacked from talkSPORT in March 2002 after failing to use the profanity delay to "dump" a caller's remarks that the British Royal Family should be shot.

In early 2004, Boyd joined BBC Southern Counties Radio, where he presented a Saturday night show (with a live internet feed) from 21:00 to 01:00 with co-presenter Allison Ferns. It was here that the zoo format was resurrected along with the more controversial aspects of the Talk Radio days. On the occasions when Ferns was absent, cover would come in the guises of Lisa Francesca Nand, Alyson Mead, and, on the New Year's Eve show in 2005, Boyd's wife, Jayne. From April 2006 to December 2007 Boyd presented a daily afternoon show from 1pm to 4pm, Monday to Friday. Several popular elements from the past resurfaced, such as "The Angry Hour", "The Irritable Hour", and once again on the final hour of the Friday show "The Wonderful Hour".

From August 2007, Boyd co-presented a Sunday night show on Play Radio UK, an internet radio station. In January 2008 he moved to Original 106 FM where he hosted the weekday breakfast show until September, before returning to Play Radio UK broadcasting a general talk and phone in show weekday late nights and via podcast, billed as "Global News Talk".

Boyd provided summer cover for Jon Gaunt on the Sun Talk, an internet-based radio station, and for a week in September 2009 he filled in for Steve Berry on 106.1 Rock Radio Manchester's Breakfast Show. In 2009 he launched a company called Digital Sport Radio, which makes radio for major sporting clubs and brands. He makes it clear that he is still keen on the talk radio concept, stating "I'm still hopeful that we'll get a proper Talk service in the UK before I go fully senile."

On 19 May 2017, Boyd returned to British talk station Talkradio for a one-off show, covering for Iain Lee. Over the following weeks he went on to fill various other time slots on the station in lieu of the usual presenters.

References

External links 
 * The Wiseman Tommy Boyd's Show "The Wiseman" at Mansize Radio (as of July 2015)

1952 births
Living people
British radio personalities
British radio DJs
Professional wrestling executives
Alumni of the University of Sussex
People from Ashford, Surrey
Butlins Redcoats
British social commentators
LBC radio presenters